, or the changing hip throw, is one of the original 40 throws of Judo as developed by Jigoro Kano. It belongs to the fourth group, Yonkyo, of the traditional throwing list, Gokyo-no-Nagewaza, of Kodokan Judo. It is also part of the current 67 Throws of Kodokan Judo. It is classified as a hip technique, Koshi-Waza.

Technique description 
Graphic
from http://www.judoinfo.com/techdraw.htm.

Judo:judoinfo.com

Exemplar videos:

Tournament
from http://www.judoinfo.com/video8.htm

Technique history

Included systems 
Systems:
Kodokan Judo, Judo Lists
Danzan Ryu, Danzan Ryu Lists
Lists:
The Canon Of Judo
Judo technique

Similar techniques, variants and aliases 
Similar techniques:

 The throw starts similar as ushiro ghoshi but before guiding uke to the ground, the throw is reversed to the dorsal part of the hip of tori by simultaniosly shifing/pulling uke to the hip and turning tori to O Ghoshi

English aliases:
Hip shift
Switching Hip Throw
Changing Hip Throw

Judo technique
Throw (grappling)